In physics and mathematics, a sequence of n numbers can specify a location in n-dimensional space. When , the set of all such locations is called a one-dimensional space. An example of a one-dimensional space is the number line, where the position of each point on it can be described by a single number.

In algebraic geometry there are several structures that are technically one-dimensional spaces but referred to in other terms. A field k is a one-dimensional vector space over itself. Similarly, the projective line over k is a one-dimensional space. In particular, if , the complex numbers, then the complex projective line P1(ℂ) is one-dimensional with respect to ℂ, even though it is also known as the Riemann sphere.

More generally, a ring is a length-one module over itself. Similarly, the projective line over a ring is a one-dimensional space over the ring. In case the ring is an algebra over a field, these spaces are one-dimensional with respect to the algebra, even if the algebra is of higher dimensionality.

Hypersphere

The hypersphere in 1 dimension is a pair of points, sometimes called a 0-sphere as its surface is zero-dimensional. Its length is

where  is the radius.

Coordinate systems in one-dimensional space

One dimensional coordinate systems include the number line.

See also
Univariate

References

Dimension
1 (number)